The Netherlands national rollball team is the national men's roll ball team of the Netherlands.

The Netherlands competed in the 2011 Roll Ball World Cup where they finished 9th and won the fair play award. Four years later they also competed at the 2015 Rollball World Cup.

Interlands

Friendly match

2011 Roll Ball World Cup

Due to food poisoning Chris Bres, the goal keeper, could not play all the matches.

2015 Rollball World Cup

Rosters

2011 Roll Ball World Cup roster
Chris Bres (G)
Gustaaf Dekking
Sander van Ginkel
Rick Henneveld
Thomas Kempen
Niek Rosens (C)

2015 Roll Ball World Cup roster
1 – Thomas Ebben (G)
3 – Casper Adrien
4 – Sander van Ginkel (C)
5 – Rigard van Klooster
30 – Roy Mulder
63 – Thijs Rooimans

References

External links
Dutch roll ball team website 
the Netherlands at the International Roll Ball Federation website

Rollball
Rollball